Star Air may refer to the following airlines:

 Star Air (Denmark), a Danish cargo airline and subsidiary of Maersk
 Star Air (India), an Indian commuter airline
 Star Air (Indonesia), a defunct Indonesian airline
 Star Air (South Africa), a South African charter airline
 Star Air Service, a defunct airline from Alaska, predecessor of Alaska Airlines

See also
 East Star Airlines, a defunct Chinese airline
 XL Airways France, a defunct French airline formerly named Star Airlines